Microsoft Bob is a Microsoft software product intended to provide a more user-friendly interface for the Windows 3.1x, Windows 95 and Windows NT operating systems, supplanting the Windows Program Manager. The program was released on March 11, 1995, and discontinued in early 1996. Microsoft Bob presented screens showing a "house", with "rooms" that the user could go to containing familiar objects corresponding to computer applications—for instance, a desk with pen and paper, a checkbook, and other items. In this case, clicking on the pen and paper would open the word processor.

A cartoon dog named Rover and other cartoon characters provided guidance using speech balloons.

Upon release, Microsoft Bob was criticized in the media and did not gain wide acceptance with users, which resulted in its discontinuation. Its legacy would be observed in future Microsoft products, notably the use of virtual assistants. The Microsoft Bob character Rover appeared as a Windows XP search companion and Clippit, nicknamed "Clippy" the anthropomorphized paperclip as a digital assistant for Microsoft Office.

History
Microsoft Bob was released in March 1995 (before Windows 95 was released), although it had been widely publicized prior to that date under the codename "Utopia". The project leader for Bob was Karen Fries, a Microsoft researcher. The design was based on research by Professors Clifford Nass and Byron Reeves of Stanford University. Melinda Gates, then wife of Bill Gates, was marketing manager for the product. Microsoft originally purchased the domain name bob.com from Boston-area techie Bob Antia, but later traded it to Bob Kerstein for the windows2000.com domain name.

Applications

Bob included various office suite programs such as a finance application and a word processor. The user interface was designed to simplify the navigational experience for novice computer users.

Similar to early graphical shells like Jane, the main interface is portrayed as the inside of a house, with different rooms corresponding to common real-world room styles such as a kitchen or family room. Each room contains decorations and furniture, as well as icons that represent applications. Bob offers the user the option of fully customizing the entire house. The user has full control over decorating each room, and can add, remove, or reposition all objects. The user can also add or remove rooms from the house and change the destinations of each door. There is also a feature in which Bob offers multiple themes for room designs and decorations, such as contemporary and postmodern.

The applications built into Bob are represented by matching decorations – for example, clicking on a clock opens the calendar, while a pen and paper represent the word processor. The user can also add shortcuts to applications on their computer. These shortcuts display the icon inside various styles of decorations such as boxes and picture frames.

Bob included the ability to install new applications, but because of the failure of the product only a single add-on application package, Microsoft Great Greetings, was ever released.

Released right as the Internet was beginning to become popular, Bob offered an email client with which a user could subscribe to MCI Mail, a dial-up email account.  The price was $5.00 per month to send up to 15 emails per month.  Each email was limited to 5000 characters, and each additional email after the limit was reached was an additional 45 cents.  A toll-free phone number had to be called to set up the account.

Bob features "Assistants", cartoon characters intended to help the user navigate the virtual house or perform tasks in the main interface or within the built-in applications.

Gateway 2000 edition
An edition of Microsoft Bob was bundled with the Gateway 2000 computer around 1995. The Gateway Edition contained Gateway branding on the login screen along with additional rooms and backgrounds not seen in the retail version. One additional room was the attic, which contained the box to a Gateway 2000 computer. Along with the additional rooms, there were more icons that appeared by default in the new rooms.

Reception and legacy
Although the Consumer Electronics Show demonstration was met with generally positive reactions, reviewers given copies of the software in advance of its launch generally derided it, and Microsoft Bob was one of Microsoft's more visible product failures. The New York Times found the characters irritating and the home design apparently the work of an "esthetically challenged sixth-grader", criticized the software's hardware requirements and the choice of file formats in which it stores its data, and concluded that it was not as simple as Microsoft advertised. The Washington Post called the home environment "sterile" and "lifeless", said that the characters' cuteness wore thin quickly, and criticized the scarce customization and access to Windows components. According to PC Data, the real sales from its release until its discontinuation were only about 58,000—far short of Microsoft's estimate that it would sell millions like Microsoft Works and Encarta. Despite being discontinued just one year after launch, Microsoft Bob continued to be severely criticized in reviews and popular media. In 2017, Melinda Gates acknowledged that the software "needed a more powerful computer than most people had back then".

Bob received the 7th place in PC World magazine's list of the 25 worst tech products of all time, number one worst product of the decade by CNET.com, and a spot in a list of the 50 worst inventions published by Time magazine, who called Bob "overly cutesy" and an "operating system designed around Clippy". Microsoft's Steve Ballmer mentioned Bob as an example of a situation in which "we decided that we have not succeeded and let's stop [now]".

Microsoft employee Raymond Chen wrote in an article that an encrypted copy of Bob was included on Windows XP install CDs to consume space to prevent piracy. It was thought that adding an additional 30 megabytes to the disc (in the era of dial up internet) would slow users of 56k modems when they attempted to download the software illegally. In November 2020, retired Microsoft engineer David Plummer confessed to be the one who put an encrypted copy of Microsoft Bob onto the Windows XP installation media. The installer would check for the "blob of Bob" and if you had the "OEM blob" you could only use an OEM product key. Tech journalist Harry McCracken called the story "a delightfully urban legend-y tale" and noted its similarities to an April Fools' Day joke claiming Bob was hidden in Windows Vista.

The use of virtual assistants in Microsoft Bob later inspired Clippit, nicknamed "Clippy" the paperclip, the default Office Assistant in Microsoft Office. Rover, the software's dog mascot, became a "search companion" for Windows XP's File Search function.

Microsoft graphic designer Vincent Connare designed the typeface Comic Sans when he noticed that Rover's speech was written in Times New Roman, which he felt seemed inappropriate for a cartoon dog. Although Connare's font did not appear in the final release of Microsoft Bob for the technical reason that the letters did not fit on any of the typographical grids, it did debut in Microsoft's 3D Movie Maker, and later emerged as an additional typeface for Windows 95.

See also
 Orphaned technology
 Packard Bell Navigator
 eWorld

Microsoft

 Microsoft Agent
 Cortana

References

External links

 Microsoft Bob Review
 Information about Microsoft Bob version 1.0 for Windows
 The GUI Gallery: Microsoft Bob' Examining Bob in the context of other graphical user interfaces
 A short computing history (story and slideshow) of Bobs from Microsoft Bob to Bob Metcalfe to Alice & Bob.
 A more in-depth article about Microsoft Bob 
 

Bob
Computer-related introductions in 1995
1995 software
Object-oriented operating systems
3D GUIs
Products and services discontinued in 1996